Old City Hall is a historic building and a National Historic Site of Canada in Guelph, Ontario, Canada, which until April 2009 served as the headquarters of the city government.  The building is now used as the Provincial Offences Courthouse, which handles matters such as traffic tickets, trespassing and liquor license violations.

History
The hall was designed in the Renaissance Revival style by Toronto architect William Thomas, and constructed 1856–1857.
The building, which included an indoor market area, administrative offices, and a large assembly hall, was constructed from locally quarried stone.

In 1984, it was designated a National Historic Site because 

The building is also designated under Part 4 of the Ontario Heritage Act.

References

External links
City of Guelph: Court Renovation and Restoration Project

Renaissance Revival architecture in Canada
National Historic Sites in Ontario
Former seats of local government
Buildings and structures in Guelph
William Thomas (architect) buildings
Courthouses in Canada
City and town halls in Ontario
Designated heritage properties in Ontario
History of Guelph